A General Abridgment of the Common Law, alphabetically digested under proper titles is a book by Knightley D'Anvers.

J. G. Marvin said:

References
D'Anvers, K. A General Abridgment of the Common Law, alphabetically digested under proper titles. 2d ed. 3 vols. fol. 1722 - 37.

External links
D'Anvers, K. A General Abridgment of the Common Law, alphabetically digested under proper titles. Printed for John Walthoe, in Vine-Court Middle Temple, adjoining to the Cloisters. London. 1705. vol 1
D'Anvers, K. A General Abridgement of the Common Law, alphabetically digested under proper titles. Printed by John Nutt, assignee of Edward Sayer, for John Waltoe. London. 1713. vol. 2

Law books